The family name Snodgrass is said to originate from lands in the parish of Irvine, Ayrshire, Scotland, known as Snodgrasse, or Snodgers, at a bend in the River Garnock at 55°38' north, 4°42' west, which were rented out in plots. Both forms are recorded in Ayrshire and in Glasgow between the 13th and 16th centuries. The name means "smooth grass" (Juncus), i.e. grass without nodes, in Middle English. In 1528 a charter from the King lists the lands of "Snotgerss" as being one of the confirmed possessions of Hugh, third Earl of Eglinton; the next record seen of the name is in the late 17th century.

Snodgrass in America

The first records of the Snodgrass family in the new world are in the early 18th century in Virginia. The Virginia town of Hedgesville (now West Virginia) was founded by William Snodgrass, who arrived in the American colonies in 1700. William Snodgrass is buried in the cemetery of Tuscarora Presbyterian Church in Berkeley County, West Virginia.  Closer examination reveals a wave of immigrants from Scotland during the Highland Clearances, Highland Potato Famine (1846–1857), and Lowland Clearances; increasing family sizes probably prompted many Snodgrasses to leave when the land could no longer support all of them.

From Pennsylvania and other ports-of-entry, they have spread across the North American continent and today there are in excess of 6,000 Snodgrass families in the United States and Canada.

Ogden Nash divided humanity into Snodgrasses and Swozzlers in his poem "Are you a Snodgrass?"

Snodgrass Clan
In April 1979, a Certificate of Incorporation was granted to the Snodgrass Clan, Inc. by the state of Indiana.
This was brought about by Scott F. Hosier, Jr. and Laurence E. Snodgrass. Through Hosier's efforts a "grant of arms" was granted to the Clan on March 15, 1984 by the Chief Herald of Ireland; however, the petition to be granted a "grant of arms" by Scotland was never finalized.

In 1979, Hosier ordered and received the first order of the official Snodgrass tartan. The weave code for the Snodgrass tartan is K6 R2 Y2 B22 G26 B10 R2 Y2, which was sourced to Dgn. T. S. Davidson.

People named Snodgrass

Snodgrass, as a surname, may refer to these notable people:
 Adrian Snodgrass, Australian architect and authority on Buddhist art
 Ann Snodgrass, American poet
 Anthony Snodgrass (born 1934), archaeologist
 Bob Snodgrass, American glass artist
 Brooklynn Snodgrass (born 1994), Canadian swimmer
 Chappie Snodgrass (1870–1951), American baseball player
 Charles Edward Snodgrass (1866–1936), American politician
 Dale Snodgrass (1949–2021), United States Naval Aviator and air show performer
 David Snodgrass (born 1958), Scottish cricketer
 Donald Ray Snodgrass (born 1935), American author
 Frank Snodgrass (1898–1976), New Zealand rugby player
 Frank E. Snodgrass (1920–1985), American oceanographer and electrical engineer
 Fred Snodgrass (1887–1974), American baseball player
 Guy Snodgrass (born 1976), American national security expert
 Harry Snodgrass (born 1963), American sound designer for film and television
 Henry C. Snodgrass (1848–1931), American politician
 John Snodgrass (diplomat) (1928–2008), British diplomat
 John F. Snodgrass (1804–1854), American politician
 John James Snodgrass (1796–1841), British Army lieutenant colonel
 Jon Snodgrass, (1941–2015), Panamanian author
 Jon Snodgrass (musician), American singer-songwriter
 Kate Snodgrass, American theater director and playwright
 Kenneth Snodgrass (1784–1853), Scottish-born soldier and administrator in colonial Australia 
 Klyne Snodgrass (born 1944), American theologian and author
 Lee Snodgrass (born 1969), American politician
 Lilburn H. Snodgrass (1859–1930), American politician
 Louise Virginia Snodgrass (1942–2009), American legislator
 Lynn Snodgrass (born ), Oregon Speaker of the House
 Mark A. Snodgrass (born 1964), American legislator
 Mary Ellen Snodgrass (born 1944), American author
 Melinda M. Snodgrass (born 1951), American science fiction writer
 Milton Moore Snodgrass (1931–2014), American author
 Natalie Snodgrass (born 1998), American ice hockey player
 Neil Snodgrass (1776–1849), Scottish inventor and engineer
 Peter Snodgrass (1817–1867), pastoralist and politician in colonial Australia 
 Richard Bruce Snodgrass (born 1940), American writer and photographer 
 Richard T. Snodgrass (born 1955), American computer scientist
 Robert Snodgrass (born 1987), Scottish footballer
 Robert Evans Snodgrass (1875–1962), American entomologist
 Sally Snodgrass (1936–2022), American politician
 W. D. Snodgrass (1926–2009), American poet who also wrote under the pseudonym S. S. Gardons
 Warren Snodgrass, American pediatric urologist
 William Snodgrass (clergyman) (1827–1906), Canadian Presbyterian minister and the sixth Principal of Queen's College, now Queen's University
 William Snodgrass (politician) (1870–1939), politician from Nelson, New Zealand
 William Davis Snodgrass (1796–1885), American Presbyterian clergyman
 William R. Snodgrass (1922–2008), Tennessee Comptroller of the Treasury

Fictional characters
 Miss Snodgrass, the archetypal punctilious English teacher
 Amanda Snodgrass, the English teacher at North Jackson High in the HBO-series Vice Principals, played by Georgia King
 Augustus Snodgrass, a major character in the novel The Pickwick Papers by Charles Dickens
 Homer Snodgrass, a character in The Mad Scientists' Club stories by Bertrand R. Brinley
 Thomas Jefferson Snodgrass, pen name used by Samuel Clemens (Mark Twain) for a sequence of travel letters now known as "The Thomas Jefferson Snodgrass Letters"
 the title character of "The Deadly Mission of Phineas Snodgrass", a short story in the collection Day Million by Frederik Pohl
 Pongo Snodgrass, of the titular comic strip in the British comics magazine Whizzer and Chips
 "Snodgrass", a story in Snodgrass and Other Illusions, a collection of short stories by Ian MacLeod in which John Lennon lives in an alternate history

References

Notes

Sources
 Metcalfe, William M. (1905). A History of the County of Renfrew from the Earliest Times. Paisley : Alexander Gardner.
 Columbia Phantasy Cartoon Nursery Crimes https://www.youtube.com/watch?v=ia8S9_1dotY

See also 
 Carrie Snodgress, (1946–2004), American actress, nominated for an Academy Award

External links
 Snodgrass tartan as recorded in the Scottish Register of Tartans
 a Snodgrass history with maps, photos, and coat of arms

Surnames of Scottish origin